"Digital (Did You Tell)" is the second single from Stone Sour's third album Audio Secrecy. The two-track promo single for the song, released strictly to radio in 2011.

Background

Regarding the lyrical inspiration for "Digital (Did You Tell)", Corey Taylor said:

Music video

The video was directed by Paul R. Brown, who previously worked with Stone Sour on the "30/30-150", "Say You'll Haunt Me" and "Hesistate" videos.

Track listing

Chart positions

References

Stone Sour songs
2010 songs
Roadrunner Records singles
Songs written by Corey Taylor
Songs written by Roy Mayorga
Songs written by Shawn Economaki
Songs written by Josh Rand
Songs written by Jim Root
Song recordings produced by Nick Raskulinecz
Post-grunge songs